The 1976–77 FA Vase was the third season of the FA Vase, an annual football competition for teams in the lower reaches of the English football league system.

Billericay Town won the competition for the second year running, beating Sheffield in the final.

Semi-finals

Billericay Town won 6–2 on aggregate.

Sheffield won 3–1 on aggregate.

Final

Replay

References

FA Vase
FA Vase
FA Vase seasons